Joshua Lee Barrett (born 21 June 1998) is an Irish footballer who plays for National League club King's Lynn Town as a midfielder. He has represented Republic of Ireland at U21 level.

Early life
Barrett's parents are from Dublin and Tipperary; he played GAA with Hampshire, growing up in Oxfordshire .

Club career

Reading
Barrett signed his first professional contract with Reading in October 2015, having joined from Irish youth side St Kevin's Boys. He went on to make his senior debut for Reading on 8 March 2016, in a 3-1 defeat away to Huddersfield Town, coming on as an 84-minute substitute for Chris Gunter.
On 21 December 2017 Barrett signed a new contract with Reading, until the summer of 2021, and also agreed to join EFL League Two side Coventry City on loan from 1 January 2018, until the end of the season. On 10 November 2018 Barrett signed for Aldershot Town on a month long loan. Barrett scored his first goals for Reading when he scored twice in an EFL Cup tie against Plymouth Argyle on 27 August 2019.

Bristol Rovers
On 7 January 2020, Barrett joined Bristol Rovers on a two-and-a-half-year contract for an undisclosed fee from Reading. Barrett failed to make an impact during the 2019–20 season that was prematurely ended in March 2020 due to the COVID-19 pandemic. This came after manager Ben Garner had, although praising his skill levels, criticised Barrett's fitness levels with the midfielder below the standards of the first-team.

Barrett made 9 appearances during the 20/21 league campaign, the Gas were relegated that same season. On 1 September 2021, it was announced that the club had terminated Barrett's contract to allow him to move on.

King's Lynn Town
On 13 October 2021, Barrett joined National League side King's Lynn Town. Barrett made his debut for the club that weekend, coming off of the bench in a 2–1 FA Cup Fourth qualifying round victory over Peterborough Sports, Barrett playing a part in the winning goal. Barrett opened his account for the club on 11 December with a double as second-bottom King's Lynn beat bottom side Dover Athletic by two goals to one.

International career
Barrett made his debut for the Republic of Ireland U17s against Hungary U17s in August 2014. Barrett was called up to the Republic of Ireland U21s for the first time in March 2016, making his debut as a 75th-minute substitute against Slovenia U21s on 28 March 2016.

On 28 May 2019, Barrett was called up to the Republic of Ireland U21 team for the 2019 Toulon Tournament. He started the match against Bahrain U23s and won the penalty for the winning goal.

Career statistics

Club

References

External links
 

Living people
1998 births
People from Paulton
Republic of Ireland association footballers
Republic of Ireland under-21 international footballers
Republic of Ireland youth international footballers
Association football midfielders
St. Kevin's Boys F.C. players
Reading F.C. players
Coventry City F.C. players
Aldershot Town F.C. players
Bristol Rovers F.C. players
King's Lynn Town F.C. players
National League (English football) players
English Football League players
Expatriate footballers in England
Irish expatriate association footballers
Irish expatriate sportspeople in England